Visa requirements for Venezuelan citizens are administrative entry restrictions by the authorities of other states placed on citizens of Venezuela. As of 7 September 2021, Venezuelan citizens had visa-free or visa on arrival access to 130 countries and territories, ranking the Venezuelan passport 40th in terms of travel freedom (tied with Tonga) according to the Henley Passport Index.

Citizens of Venezuela do not need to use a passport when traveling to Argentina and Brazil, as they may use their ID card. Moreover, Venezuelans may also travel to the United States, Canada, Spain and several Latin American countries using expired passports.

Since 2017, 20 countries in Latin America and Caribbean (El Salvador, Panama, Honduras, Guatemala, St Lucia, Peru, Trinidad and Tobago, Chile, Ecuador, Dominican Republic, Aruba, Bonaire, Curaçao, St Marteen, St Eustatius, Saba, Mexico, Costa Rica, Belize and Nicaragua) have stopped providing visa-free access to Venezuelans following the ongoing refugee crisis and reinstated visa requirements for those seeking to enter these countries. Some countries will still allow Venezuelans to enter visa-free if holding a valid visa/residence permit from a particular third country, such as Canada, the Schengen Area, Japan or the United States; and in the case of Mexico offers visa-free if holding a residence from a country of the Pacific Alliance (Chile, Colombia and Peru).

Visa requirements map

Visa requirements
Visa requirements for holders of normal passports traveling for tourist purposes:

Dependent, Disputed, or Restricted territories 
Visa requirements for Venezuelan citizens for visits to various territories, disputed areas, partially recognized countries not mentioned in the list above, and restricted zones:

Non-visa restrictions

See also

 Visa policy of Venezuela
 Venezuelan passport
 Venezuelan nationality law

Notes

References

Venezuela
Foreign relations of Venezuela